Matt Love is a Canadian politician, who was elected to the Legislative Assembly of Saskatchewan in the 2020 Saskatchewan general election. He represents the electoral district of Saskatoon Eastview as a member of the Saskatchewan New Democratic Party caucus.

On November 4, 2020, Love was named NDP critic for Municipal Affairs, Tourism, Seniors, Ethics and Democracy, and Parks, Culture and Sport, in addition to serving as the deputy Caucus Chair.

Electoral record

References

Living people
21st-century Canadian politicians
Saskatchewan New Democratic Party MLAs
Politicians from Saskatoon
Year of birth missing (living people)